The 1818 United States Senate election in Pennsylvania was held on December 8, 1818. Walter Lowrie was elected by the Pennsylvania General Assembly to the United States Senate.

Results
Incumbent Democratic-Republican Abner Lacock, who was elected in 1812, was not a candidate for re-election to another term. The Pennsylvania General Assembly, consisting of the House of Representatives and the Senate, convened on December 8, 1818, to elect a new Senator to fill the term beginning on March 4, 1819. The results of the vote of both houses combined are as follows:

|-
|-bgcolor="#EEEEEE"
| colspan="3" align="right" | Totals
| align="right" | 128
| align="right" | 100.00%
|}

References

External links
Pennsylvania Election Statistics: 1682-2006 from the Wilkes University Election Statistics Project

1818
Pennsylvania
United States Senate
December 1818 events